The Vyas Institutes of Higher Education is a group of College set up in Jodhpur, Rajasthan, India, in 1999 by the Rajasthan Vikas Sansthan. The Society educate in the fields of Medical, Engineering, and Management.

Colleges
Vyas Dental College and General Hospital (VDCH)
Vyas Institute of Engineering & Technology (VIET)
Vyas College of Engineering & Technology (VCET)
Vyas Institute of Management (VIM)
Vyas College of Nursing (VCON)
Vyas B.Ed. College (VBC)
Vyas Nursing Institute(VNI)
Vyas College of Commerce and Business Administration (VCCBA)
Vyas Institute of Management(VIM)

Courses
 MDS
 BDS
 B.Tech
 MBA
 Nursing
 B.com
 B.ed
 PGDM

Infrastructure

Campus
The campus is spread over 30 acres and has many green areas. The world-class infrastructure is in the form of auditoriums, seminar halls, many laboratories, classrooms, libraries, canteens, faculty corporate visitors and foreigners.

Hostel
The college has AC 2 girls hostels. The boys and girls hostel has 92 rooms which can accommodate 214 students. Rooms are spacious, clean and can accommodate 2 members. There is 24*7 water and electricity supply and provides hygienic meals all around the day.

Transport
The college provides 25 buses to all students equipped with GPS tracking system.

External links
 Official website

Universities and colleges in Jodhpur
Educational institutions established in 1999
1999 establishments in Rajasthan